Sullah, also spelt Sulla, is an upazila (sub-district) of the Sunamganj District, located in Bangladesh's Sylhet Division. Its headquarters is located in Ghungiargaon.

History
It is generally thought that the area presently comprising Sullah Upazila was formerly inhabited by the Khasi people, which can be understood from the Khalisha Hati, Bara Hati, Kakura Hati and Godir Bak of Chobbisha village. The two mounds discovered in the village of Khalli and other mounds also provides evidence for thousand-year old tribal settlement. Among the 120 mosques in Sullah, the Ghungiargaon-Sullah Jame Mosque, Srihail Saheb Bari Jame Mosque and Bahara Jame Mosque are of historical importance.

Sullah Upazila is named after the village of Sullah which sits on the bank of the Kalni River. A small bazaar was established in the village and named Shahaganj Bazar, after Shah Nur, who was a prominent wali who lived in the village. However, the name of Shah Ullah was more prominent, and this later became corrupted to Sullah (pronounced Shalla).

In 1919, a naval police headquarters was established in Sullah village. It was converted into an administrative thana in 1941. However, as a result of the breakage in the strong current of the Kalni river, the infrastructure of the thana was destroyed. The local chiefs then re-established the headquarters in the village of Ghungiargaon, located in the centre of Sullah Thana. During the Bangladesh Liberation War of 1971, Sullah was a part of Sector 5 under Mir Shawkat Ali. Sullah was liberated on 7 December. Sullah Thana was upgraded to upazila (sub-district) in 1983 as part of the President of Bangladesh Hussain Muhammad Ershad's decentralisation programme. In 1987, the Hashimia Islami Madrasa was founded in Sullah which contributed to the educational development.

Geography
It has 13881 households and total area 260.74 km2.

Demographics
As of the 1991 Bangladesh census, Sullah has a population of 89941. Males constitute 51.08% of the population, and females 48.92%. This Upazila's eighteen up population is 43247. Sullah has an average literacy rate of 21.8% (7+ years), and the national average of 32.4% literate.

Administration
Sullah Upazila is divided into four union parishads: Atgaon, Bahara, Habibpur, and Shalla. The union parishads are subdivided into 65 mauzas and 116 villages.

List of chairmen

Notable people
Chowdhury Abdullah Al-Mamun, 31st Inspector General of Bangladesh Police

See also
Upazilas of Bangladesh
Districts of Bangladesh
Divisions of Bangladesh

References

Upazilas of Sunamganj District